Kristiine Centre is a shopping centre in Tallinn, Estonia. It's situated in Kristiine district's subdistrict of Lilleküla. Kristiine is one of the largest shopping centres in Estonia by the amount of shops. It has a gross leasable area of  containing nearly 170 different shops (including 18 restaurants and cafés).

The shopping centre has three floors, with the shops and other commercial services on the ground and first floors. The third floor is reserved for parking. The biggest shops in the centre are Prisma, H&M, Marks and Spencer, Euronics, and Apollo.

Kristiine Centre opened in 1999. At first, it was planned to be a  shopping centre but a  centre was built instead. The building cost 19,174 million euros. In 2010, a second extension was built, adding another  to the centre's area.

Facts about the centre
 The centre has been visited by 73 million people during the past ten years.
 According to Emor's last research, Kristiine Centre is the most popular shopping centre in Tallinn.
 The centre's 10 years' sales is 683,855 billion Euros.
 The centre's market value was approximately 89,476,300 Euros.

References

External links
 

Buildings and structures in Tallinn
Shopping centres in Estonia
Shopping malls established in 1999
1999 establishments in Estonia
Tourist attractions in Tallinn